Zhang Wei or Zhangwei may refer to:

People

Sportspeople
 Zhang Wei (badminton, born 1977) (张尉), Chinese badminton player, winner of the 2000 Thailand Open
 Zhang Wei (badminton, born 1987), (张伟) Chinese badminton player, winner of the 2001 Sudirman Cup
 Zhang Wei (basketball) (張伟 born 1986), female Chinese basketball player
 Zhang Wei (figure skater) (張崴), Chinese ice dancer
 Zhang Wei (footballer, born 1988),(张炜) Chinese footballer who plays for Kunshan in the CLO
 Zhang Wei (footballer, born January 1993) (张卫), Chinese footballer who plays for Nantong Zhiyun in the CSL
 Zhang Wei (footballer, born March 1993) (张卫), Chinese footballer who plays for Shanghai SIPG in the CSL
 Zhang Wei (footballer, born 2000),(张威) Chinese footballer who plays for Hebei China Fortune in the CSL
 Zhang Wei (goalball) (张魏, born 1989), Chinese goalball player
 Zhang Wei (pole vaulter) (张伟 born 1994), Chinese pole vaulter

Other people
 Zhang Wei (painter) (张伟, born 1952), Chinese painter, member of the No Name Group 
 Zhang Wei (author) (张炜, born 1956), Chinese author
 Zhang Wei (mathematician) (张伟, born 1981), Chinese mathematician
 Wowkie Zhang (张伟, born 1983), Chinese singer and actor, former member of The Flowers
 Zhang Wei (actor), Singaporean actor, see List of MediaCorp Channel 8 Chinese Drama Series (2000s)
 , (張為) Tang dynasty poet and compiler of the Schematic of Masters and Followers Among the Poets (詩人主客圖)
 Zhang Wei (張衛), younger brother of the Eastern Han dynasty warlord Zhang Lu
 Zhang Wei (director) (born 1965), Chinese film director, known for Factory Boss
 Zhang Wei, also known as Tang Jia San Shao

Places in China
Zhangwei, Heilongjiang (张维), town in Suihua, Heilongjiang
Zhangwei Township (张圩乡), township in Shuyang County, Jiangsu

See also
 Wang Wei (disambiguation)
 Wang Fang (disambiguation)